This is a list of all former managers of the Colombian football team Atlético Junior. Current coach Luis Amaranto Perea took over from Julio Comesaña on September 14, 2020.

Managers

 Jack Greenwell (1940–42)
 Roberto Meléndez (1948)
 Tim (1950–51)
 Friedrich Donnenfeld (1951–53)
  (1966)
  (1966)
 Narciso Pino (1966)
 Efraín Sánchez (1966–67)
 William Martínez (1967)
 (1967–68)
 Julio Tocker (1969)
 Othon Dacunha (1969)
  (1969–71)
 Efraín Sánchez (1971)
  (1972)
 Marcos Coll (1973)
 Rubens (1973)
 Francisco Villegas (1973)
  (1974)
 Marcos Coll (1975)
 Carlos Peña (1975)
  (1975)
 José Varacka (1975–77)
 Carlos Peña (1977)
 Juan Ramón Verón (1977)
 Mario Patrón (1978)
 Carlos Peña (1978)
 Miguel Ángel López (1978)
 Carlos Peña (1978)
 Vladislao Cap (1978)
 Juan Ramón Verón (1979)
 José Varacka (1980–81)
 Marcos Coll (1981)
 Carlos Peña (1981)
 Néstor Manfredi (1981–82)
 Marcos Coll (1982)
 Néstor Manfredi (1982)
 Othon Dacunha (1982)
 Jorge Solari (1983)
 José Varacka (1984)
 Roberto Saporiti (1985)
 Eduardo Solari (1986)
 Efraín Sánchez (1986–87)
 Carlos Peña (1987)
 José Varacka (1987–88)
 Carlos Peña (1988)
 Miguel Ángel López (1988–89)
 Carlos Peña (1990)
 Hugo Gallego (1990)
  Julio Comesaña (1991)
 Miguel Ángel López (1992)
 Dulio Miranda (1992)
 Carlos Peña (1992)
  Julio Comesaña (1992–94)
 Dulio Miranda (1994)
 Carlos Restrepo (1995)
  (1995–96)
 Juan Mujica (1995–96)
  Julio Comesaña (1996–97)
 Luis Grau (1996–97)
 Julio César Uribe (1996–97)
 Javier Castell (1998)
 Miguel Ángel López (1998–Feb 00)
 Juan José Peláez (Feb 2000–June 00)
 Norberto Peluffo (July 2000–Sept 01)
 Dulio Miranda (interim) (Sept 2001)
 Salvador Capitano (Sept 2001–Dec 31, 2001)
 Luis Grau (interim) (Feb 2002)
 Dulio Miranda (Feb 2002)
  Julio Comesaña (March 2002–Sept 02)
 Alexis Mendoza (interim) (Sept 2002)
 Dragan Miranović (Feb 2003–June 3)
 Dušan Drašković (July 2003–Aug 03)
 Othon Dacunha (interim) (Aug 2003)
 Jorge Luis Pinto (Aug 2003–June 4)
 Miguel Ángel López (Aug 2004–May 5)
 Carlos Ischia (July 2005–Sept 05)
 Norberto Peluffo (Sept 2005–April 6)
 Jorge Alcázar (interim) (April 2006–May 6)
 Dragan Miranović (July 2006–Oct 06)
 Miguel Ángel López (Oct 2006–May 7)
 Luis Grau (July 2007–Nov 08)
 Santiago Escobar (Jan 1, 2008–March 1, 2008)
  Julio Comesaña (March 11, 2008–Dec 31, 2009)
 Diego Umaña (Jan 1, 2010–Dec 31, 2010)
  Ó.H. Quintabani (Nov 16, 2010–May 30, 2011)
 Fernel Díaz (interim) (May 2011–June 11)
 Jorge Luis Pinto (June 1, 2011–Aug 31, 2011)
  (Sept 1, 2011–Dec 31, 2012)
 Alexis García (Jan 1, 2013–June 4, 2013)
 Miguel Ángel López (June 5, 2013 – March 19, 2014)
 David Pinillos (May 2014)
  Julio Comesaña (May 2014–Dec 14)
 Alexis Mendoza (Jan 2015–July 2016)
 Giovanni Hernández (25 July 2016–21 November 2016)
 Alberto Gamero (27 December 2016–26 March 2017)
  Julio Comesaña (April 1, 2017–December 5, 2017)
 Alexis Mendoza (December 14, 2017–April 9, 2018)
  Julio Comesaña (April 11, 2018–December 19, 2018)
 Luis Fernando Suárez (December 20, 2018–May 3, 2019)
  Julio Comesaña (May 4, 2019–September 14, 2020)
 Luis Amaranto Perea (September 14, 2020–August 17, 2021)
 Arturo Reyes (August 17, 2021–Present)

References

Atlético Junior
Junior